Ernst Huhn (1894–1964) was a German architect who first rebuilt and later designed cinemas, theatres and inns, including the Schauspielhaus Bad Godesberg, Germany's first new theatre after the Second World War

Life 
Huhn was one of the close collaborators of the architect Wilhelm Kreis for a long time during his Düsseldorf years (1908–1926). From the end of the 1920s, Huhn emerged, especially in the area of the Rhineland, as an architect for cinema and theatre buildings as well as inns. He worked in Düsseldorf and was a member of the Association of German Architects. He reported on some of his buildings in the trade journal .

Projects 

 1926: Ice pavilion at the GeSoLei exhibition in Düsseldorf
 1928: Odeon cinema, rebuilding a ball room nn Düsseldorf-Unterbilk
 1928: Nationaltheater cinema, rebuilding the Kaiser-Friedrich-Halle in Viersen, Heierstraße 2
 1935: Apollo-Theater (Siegen) 
 1936: Capitol cinema in Bielefeld.
 1936: Rebuilding  hotel in Cologne.
 1949: Modernising Europa-Palast cinema in Düsseldorf, Graf-Adolf-Straße (location of the  until 1938)
 1949: Reconstruction of Modernes Theater (UFA cinema)“ in Wuppertal  
 1950: Reconstruction of the Apollo-Theater in Düsseldorf (with more than 3000 seats)
 1951: Reconstruction of Viktoria-Theater cinema in Hagen
 1951–1952: Schauspielhaus Bad Godesberg, Germany's first new theatre after the Second World War
 1953: Theater am Aegi in Hanover (together with Hans Klüppelberg and Gerd Lichtenhahn) 
 1954: Stadttheater Remscheid
 1954: Atlantis-Palast cinema in Duisburg-Marxloh, Weseler Straße 66 
 1954–1956: Opernhaus Düsseldorf (together with Julius Schulte-Frohlinde and Paul Bonatz)
 1955: Kino Ufa-Palast in Cologne, Hohenstaufenring
 around 1960: Wohn- und Geschäftshaus with cinema in Cologne, Kaiser-Wilhelm-Ring 30–32
 until 1963: Studiohaus of Firma Rosenthal in Düsseldorf, Königsallee / Graf-Adolf-Straße (together with Günter Huhn)

References

Further reading 
 Sabine Steidle: Kinoarchitektur im Nationalsozialismus. Eine kultur- und medienhistorische Studie zur Vielfalt der Moderne. Kliomedia, Trier 2012, .

External links 
 
 Huhn, Ernst, Datenblatt im Portal nrw-architekturdatenbank.tu-dortmund.de (Architecture data bank of the Technical University of Dortmund)

20th-century German architects
1894 births
1964 deaths
Place of birth missing